The medial cutaneous nerve of the forearm (also known as the medial antebrachial cutaneous nerve) is a sensory branch of the medial cord of the brachial plexus derived from the ventral rami of spinal nerves C8-T1. It provides sensory innervation to the skin of the medial forearm and skin overlying the olecranon. It descends through the (upper) arm within the brachial fascia alongside the basilic vein, then divides into an anterior branch and a posterior branch upon emerging from the brachial fascia; the two terminal branches travel as far distally as the wrist.

Anatomy

Course and relations 
It gives off a branch near the axilla, which pierces the fascia and supplies the skin covering the biceps brachii, nearly as far as the elbow.

The nerve then runs down the ulnar side of the arm medial to the brachial artery, pierces the deep fascia with the basilic vein, about the middle of the arm, and divides into a volar and an ulnar branch.

Branches

Volar branch 
The volar branch (ramus volaris; anterior branch), the larger, passes usually in front of, but occasionally behind, the vena mediana cubiti (median basilic vein).

It then descends on the front of the ulnar side of the forearm, distributing filaments to the skin as far as the wrist, and communicating with the palmar cutaneous branch of the ulnar nerve.

Ulnar branch 
The ulnar branch (ramus ulnaris; posterior branch) passes obliquely downward on the medial side of the basilic vein, in front of the medial epicondyle of the humerus, to the back of the forearm, and descends on its ulnar side as far as the wrist, distributing filaments to the skin.

It communicates with the medial brachial cutaneous, the dorsal antebrachial cutaneous branch of the radial, and the dorsal branch of the ulnar.

See also
 Dorsal antebrachial cutaneous nerve
 Lateral antebrachial cutaneous nerve
 Medial brachial cutaneous nerve

Additional images

References

External links
 , 
 
 
  - "Cutaneous nerves of the upper extremity."
 

Nerves of the upper limb